Cellana flava is a species of true limpet, a marine gastropod mollusc in the family Nacellidae, one of the families of true limpets.

This species is easily identified on the basis of the orange colour of its shell and the light coloured head and foot.

References

 Powell A. W. B., William Collins Publishers Ltd, Auckland 1979 
 Nakano T. & Ozawa T. (2007). Worldwide phylogeography of limpets of the order Patellogastropoda: molecular, morphological and paleontological evidence. Journal of Molluscan Studies 73(1): 79–99

Nacellidae
Gastropods of New Zealand
Gastropods described in 1784